Bahri Fazliu (1971–1998) was a Kosovo Albanian poet, publicist, and nationalist.

Biography
Bahri Fazliu was born in the village of Llausha near Podujevo, Yugoslavia, today's Kosovo.
He was the younger brother of Fahri Fazliu, PMK member who lost his life in a shoot-out with Yugoslav police on November 2, 1989, in "Kodra e Diellit" neighborhood in Prishtina.

Bahri was one of the founders of NMLK, and its leader after the imprisonment of Avni Klinaku. NMLK was a revolutionary movement, and a constant criticizer of Democratic League of Kosovo and Ibrahim Rugova's Gandhism.

He was the chief editor of the newspaper Çlirimi (English: Liberation), which would be secretly delivered inside Kosovo every three months.
On May 7, 1998, he got involved in a skirmish with the Yugoslav Army in an area called Bjeshka e Bogiqes, in the vicinity of Plav, a Montenegrin town at the border between Albania, Montenegro, and Kosovo (then Serbia, Yugoslavia), eventually getting killed. This was 4 days before the official agreement between NMLK and newly-active Kosovo Liberation Army, that would result in NMLK officially joining KLA.

Legacy
There are streets in nowadays Kosovo which bear his name. He would later receive the title "Hero of Kosovo".

Publications
 Kundër mistifikimit, për të vërtetën (English: Against mystification, for the truth), Çlirimi, Prishtina,  2000.

See also
Albanians in Kosovo
National Movement for the Liberation of Kosovo
Albanian Nationalism
Kosovo Liberation Army
Kosovo War

Notes

References

1971 births
1998 deaths
Albanian nationalists in Kosovo
Kosovo Albanians
Kosovo Liberation Army soldiers
People from Podujevo
People murdered in Montenegro
20th-century Albanian military personnel
Military personnel killed in the Kosovo War